Bristol Farms Inc. is an upscale grocery store chain in California, United States. Founded in Los Angeles County, Bristol Farms operates 19 stores: 14 as Bristol Farm locations and 5 branded as Lazy Acres Markets throughout Southern California. The company is currently owned by Good Food Holdings.

History

Early history 
Bristol Farms opened its first store in 1982 in Rolling Hills Estates, California. The company was started by Irv Gronsky and Mike Burbank, who had worked together for almost twenty years in the food industry. Their vision was to combine the service and food quality of a corner grocer, butcher, and baker with the theatre of Harrods in London. The first store was an overwhelming success.

The company went on to add stores in California. In June 1999, they acquired a famous landmark, the Chalet Gourmet in West Hollywood, California.

Owned by Albertsons, Inc. 
In 2004, Bristol Farms was purchased by Albertsons, Inc.

In October 2005, Bristol Farms purchased Santa Barbara-based Lazy Acres. Independently owned, the Lazy Acres store was sold to Bristol Farms allegedly as a defensive move against Whole Foods' pending arrival in Santa Barbara. This was Bristol Farms' first location in Santa Barbara. The  Lazy Acres store itself continues to operate under its original format. The Bristol Farms name does not appear on Lazy Acres signage or advertisements. The Long Beach Bristol Farms was converted into a second Lazy Acres in November 2012.

In 2006, Bristol Farms opened its doors at the newly expanded Westfield San Francisco Centre in downtown San Francisco. The San Francisco site covered over half of the concourse in the mall's lower level. This location closed on January 27, 2017, leaving Bristol Farms without a location in Northern California.
 
Four former Albertsons locations have been converted into Bristol Farms: one in San Diego's La Jolla neighborhood, the second in Palm Desert (which originally opened as Lucky), a third location in Los Angeles' Westchester neighborhood (which had also been a Lucky), and a fourth in Santa Monica. In 2020, Bristol Farms replaced a Vons in La Cumbre Plaza in Santa Barbara and opened its first store in the area.

Owned by Supervalu, Inc. 
On June 2, 2006, Bristol Farms' parent company, Albertsons, Inc., was purchased by investors led by Cerberus Capital Management and Supervalu, Inc. Upon the transaction's close, Bristol Farms became a wholly owned subsidiary of Supervalu, Inc.

On November 12, 2008, Bristol Farms opened its 17th location. This  location, unlike many Bristol Farms' then-current locations, was built new from the ground up. The store is located in the Bridgeport Marketplace mixed-use shopping center within the Bridgeport residential neighborhood in Santa Clarita, California. New features at this location are individual "shops" with full façades and themed props, a fresh juice and smoothie counter, a fresh sushi department with sushi made onsite every day, a coffee bar, and an eat-in café. The wine area, with its four walls, wine racks, and roof trellis, resembles a specialty wine boutique. Over  of hand-painted murals by studio artists at D.L. English Design depict picturesque scenes of the Santa Clarita Valley throughout the store.

Independent again 
On October 29, 2010, Supervalu announced that it had sold the Bristol Farms chain to a new company formed by a private investment firm, Endeavour Capital, and the chain's management team.

Owned by Good Food Holdings, Inc. 
Bristol Farms, Lazy Acres Market, and Metropolitan Market are all sister companies currently owned by California-based private holding company Good Food Holdings, Inc.

Good Food Holdings, Inc. was acquired in 2018 by Emart, South Korea's largest retailer, for $275 million.

Lazy Acres Market, Inc. 
Lazy Acres Market Inc. is a small chain of five grocery stores known for selling natural and organic foods, gourmet foods, supplements, body care products, and eco-friendly goods. The stores, in Santa Barbara, Hermosa Beach, Long Beach, Encinitas, and San Diego (Mission Hills) are owned and operated by Bristol Farms. The original Santa Barbara store was founded in 1991 by Jimmy Searcy, Hugo van Seenus, and Irwin Carasso. Their second location opened in 2012 in Long Beach, California. The most recent store opening was in Hermosa Beach in October 2018.

References

External links

 Retail companies established in 1982
 Supermarkets of the United States
 Companies based in Los Angeles County, California
1982 establishments in California